This is a sortable table of the approximately 2,060 townlands in County Roscommon, Ireland.

Duplicate names occur where there is more than one townland with the same name in the county. Names marked in bold typeface are towns and villages, and the word Town appears for those entries in the Acres column.

Townland list

References

 
Roscommon
Roscommon
Townlands